HMS Prince of Wales was a 98-gun second-rate ship of the line of the Royal Navy, launched on 28 June 1794 at Portsmouth.

In the spring of 1795, she served as the flagship of Admiral Henry Harvey who commanded a squadron in the North Sea and later participated in the Battle of Groix in 1795. Prince of Wales served as the flagship of Admiral Robert Calder at the Battle of Cape Finisterre in 1805. She was not present at Trafalgar. In consequence of the strong feeling against him for his conduct at Cape Finisterre, Calder had demanded a court-martial. Nelson was ordered to send Calder home, and allowed him to return in his own flagship, even though battle was imminent. Calder left in early October 1805, missing the battle.

Prince of Wales was broken up in December 1822.

Notes

References

Lavery, Brian (2003) The Ship of the Line - Volume 1: The development of the battlefleet 1650-1850. Conway Maritime Press. .
Winfield, Rif (2007) British Warships in the Age of Sail 1714-1792: Design, Construction, Careers and Fates. Seaforth Publishing. .

External links
 

Ships of the line of the Royal Navy
Boyne-class ships of the line (1790)
1794 ships